Abar Basanta Bilap is a 2018 Bengali language romantic comedy film directed by Rajesh Dutta and Ipsita Roy Sarkar and produced by Indrajit Roy Sarkar and Mahua Datta. The film features Paran Bandopadhyay, Kharaj Mukherjee, Moon Moon Sen, Bihu Mukherjee and Mir Afsar Ali Bihu Mukherjee & Satyahari Mondal in pivotal roles.

Plot summary
Badur Bagan is a locality in North Kolkata. Just beside there is place named Muchi Bagan. Just like the way North Kolkata looks, this place is exactly the same, old houses with big windows, wide ground floor balcony for chit chat and gossips, narrow streets, by lanes and so on.

And in this same locality our story's main character Anadi Chakraborty resides by giving only 50 INR as monthly rent. He is an upper class Brahmin. By not following his ancestor's footsteps and went to the same profession of being Hindu priests, he chooses to be a proofreader of an elite publication in College Street named Basanta Bilap, and he is the senior proof reader there.

Though Anadi is a typical dedicated honest responsible simple man then also because of his single flaw he gets bad treatment everywhere starting from his wife to boss in his office.

He often forget things, and that is his flaw. For example, if his wife Nilima asked him to bring fish from the market, he brings green vegetables while returning. This absent mindedness continues in office as well, and he often gets scolding from Paranpriyo, the manager. "You will soon lose your job, Anadi."

He himself used to stay very tensed regarding this job, he used to mummer "maybe I will lose this job."

He has a son named Shibu Chakraborty, who is jobless spoil brat. All of a sudden he falls for Radhika. But smart beautiful Radhika gives a shit about it; she was not at all interested.

Radhika used to come to Muchi Bagan for Bengali tuition to Dimpida. Dimpida is bit different from the rest, bit feminine from inside. When he used to be in his college days, he was impressed by the character of Rishi Kapoor in the film named Sagar and started imagining himself as Dimple Kapadia.

Cast
 Paran Bandopadhyay
 Kharaj Mukherjee
 Moon Moon Sen
 Bihu Mukherjee
 Mir Afsar Ali as Dimpida
 Satyahari Mondal

Releases 
The film was released on 13 July 2018 on theatres.

References

External links

2018 films
Indian drama films
Films set in West Bengal
Bengali-language Indian films
2010s Bengali-language films
2018 drama films